General Stafford (1868–1923) was a Major League Baseball player. General Stafford may also refer to:

David A. Stafford (1893–1959), U.S. Marine Corps brigadier general
Humphrey Stafford, 1st Duke of Buckingham (1402–1460), English general
Leroy Augustus Stafford (1822–1864), Confederate States Army brigadier general
Thomas P. Stafford (born 1930), U.S. Air Force lieutenant general